is a Japanese former footballer.

Career statistics

Club

Notes

References

1987 births
Living people
Association football people from Tokyo
Shizuoka Sangyo University alumni
Japanese footballers
Japanese expatriate footballers
Association football midfielders
Singapore Premier League players
Albirex Niigata Singapore FC players
Japanese expatriate sportspeople in Singapore
Expatriate footballers in Singapore
Japanese expatriate sportspeople in Germany
Expatriate footballers in Germany